Fantome-Stein is a webcomic by Beka Duke. It is based on the premise that Frankenstein's monster did not die but went on to become The Phantom of the Opera.

Premise and development 
In Fantome-Stein, Frankenstein's monster did not die but went on to become The Phantom of the Opera. The story follows Frankenstein's monster and his struggle to find humanity and to win the affections of Christine Daae. The comic draws inspiration from Israeli and Middle-Eastern culture.

The comic was initially published on Tumblr but now has its own website. The comic was also published on Tapas, but Duke removed it from that site after Tapas changed its terms of service. The last update to the comic was in February 2020, in the middle of a chapter, after 141 pages.

Reception 
Fantom-Stein was a runner up in ComicsAlliance's "Best New Webcomic of 2015". In announcing the result, ComicsAlliance writer Charlotte Finn said that the comic "is drenched in atmosphere, with thick scratchy inks, bold lettering with perfectly chosen fonts, and desaturated colors wringing the operatic melodrama for all that it's worth.

Author 
Fantome-Stein is created by Beka Duke. As of 2015, Duke was attending Southern Arkansas University, studying Game and Animation Design and Communication Design. She was encouraged to create a comic book by a professor. Fantome-Stein counted towards her class credits. Duke was 23 as of January 2016, and grew up mostly in Israel.

Notes and references

Notes

References

External links 
 

2015 webcomic debuts
American webcomics
Comics based on Frankenstein
Tapastic webcomics
Webtoons
Works based on The Phantom of the Opera